The 2021 Italian Basketball Supercup, also known as Discovery+ Supercoppa 2021 for sponsorship reasons, was the 27th edition of the super cup tournament, organized by the Lega Basket Serie A (LBA). The title was won by Virtus Segafredo Bologna, which defeated AX Armani Exchange Milano 90–84.

Participant teams

Source:

Group stage

Group A

Group B

Group C

Group D

Final Eight

Quarterfinals

Carpegna Prosciutto Pesaro vs. Umana Reyer Venezia

Happy Casa Brindisi vs. Banco di Sardegna Sassari

AX Armani Exchange Milano vs. NutriBullet Treviso Basket

Virtus Segafredo Bologna vs. Bertram Derthona Tortona

Semifinals

Happy Casa Brindisi vs. AX Armani Exchange Milano

Umana Reyer Venezia vs. Virtus Segafredo Bologna

Final

AX Armani Exchange Milano vs. Virtus Segafredo Bologna

Sponsors

References

External links
 LBA Supercoppa official website

Italian Basketball Cup
2021–22 in Italian basketball